There are typically two types of clothing worn in Japan: traditional clothing known as , including the national dress of Japan, the kimono, and , which encompasses all else not recognised as either national dress or the dress of another country.

Traditional Japanese fashion represents a long-standing history of traditional culture, encompassing colour palettes developed in the Heian period, silhouettes adopted from Tang dynasty clothing and cultural traditions, motifs taken from Japanese culture, nature and traditional literature, the use of types of silk for some clothing, and styles of wearing primarily fully-developed by the end of the Edo period. The most well-known form of traditional Japanese fashion is the kimono, with the term kimono translating literally as "something to wear" or "thing worn on the shoulders".

Modern Japanese fashion mostly encompasses  (Western clothes), though many well-known Japanese fashion designers – such as Issey Miyake, Yohji Yamamoto and Rei Kawakubo – have taken inspiration from and at times designed clothes taking influence from traditional fashion. Their works represent a combined impact on the global fashion industry, with many pieces displayed at fashion shows all over the world, as well as having had an impact within the Japanese fashion industry itself, with many designers either drawing from or contributing to Japanese street fashion.

Despite previous generations wearing traditional clothing near-entirely, following the end of World War II, Western clothing and fashion became increasingly popular due to their increasingly-available nature and, over time, their cheaper price. It is now increasingly rare for someone to wear traditional clothing as everyday clothes, and over time, traditional clothes within Japan have garnered an association with being difficult to wear and expensive.

Traditional Japanese clothing has garnered fascination in the Western world as a representation of a different culture; first gaining popularity in the 1860s, Japonisme saw traditional clothing – some produced exclusively for export and differing in construction from the clothes worn by Japanese people everyday – exported to the West, where it soon became a popular item of clothing for artists and fashion designers. Fascination for the clothing of Japanese people continued into WW2, where some stereotypes of Japanese culture such as "geisha girls" became widespread. Over time, depictions and interest in traditional and modern Japanese clothing has generated discussions surrounding cultural appropriation and the ways in which clothing can be used to stereotype a culture; in 2016, the "Kimono Wednesday" event held at the Boston Museum of Arts became a key example of this.

History

Yayoi period (Neolithic to Iron Age)

Little is known of the clothing of the Yayoi period. In the 3rd-century  (a section of the Records of the Three Kingdoms compiled by Chinese scholar Chen Shou), there is some description of clothing worn in Japan. It describes broad cloth (possibly double-width), made into unshaped garments by being tied about the waist and shoulders.

Kofun period (300–538 CE) 

Until the 5th century CE, there is little artistic evidence of the clothing worn in Japan. Kofun period clothing is known from clay sculptures used atop  offering cylinders. These were used in the 5th and 6th century, though most  have no sculpture on top. These figures likely do not represent everyday dress; they may represent riding dress. Many wear armour.

In the Kofun period, the right side was wrapped over the left (unlike in China), and the overlapped edge was secured with ties on the right side. Sleeves and trousers were tubular. Female figures often wear a skirt, with male figures wearing trousers tied with garters just above the calf, so that they balloon over the knee, allowing freedom of movement.

Traditional Chinese clothing had been introduced to Japan via Chinese envoys in the Kofun period, with immigration between the two countries and envoys to the Tang dynasty court leading to Chinese styles of dress, appearance and culture becoming extremely popular in Japanese court society. The Imperial Japanese court quickly adopted Chinese styles of dress and clothing. As early as the 4th century CE, images of priestess-queens and tribal chiefs in Japan depicted figures wearing clothing similar that of Han dynasty China. There is evidence of the oldest samples of  tie-dyed fabric stored at the Shōsōin Temple being Chinese in origin, due to the limitations of Japan's ability to produce the fabrics at the time (see ).

Asuka period (538–710 CE)

The Asuka period began with the introduction of Buddhism, and the writing system of Chinese characters to Japan; during this time, Chinese influence over Japan was fairly strong.

Judging by the depictions in the Tenjukoku Shūchō Mandala, during the reign of Empress Suiko (593–628), male and female court dress were very similar. Both wore round-necked front-fastening  with non-overlapping lapels, the front, collar, and cuffs edged with contrasting fabric, possibly an underlayer; the  skirt, above knee-length, had a matching edge.

The Takamatsuzuka Tomb is a major source of information for upper-class clothing of this period. (black gauze caps stiffened with lacquer) were being worn by male courtiers, and were regulaed in the 11th regnal year of Emperor Tenmu (~684 CE); this fashion persists in formal use into the 21st century.

Nara period (710–794) 

Nara-period upper-class clothing was much simpler than some later styles, taking no more than a few minutes to don, with the clothing itself allowing for freedom of movement. Women's upper-class dress consisted of a left-over-right lap-fronted top (over a similar underrobe), and a wrapped, pleated skirt. Women also sometimes wore a lap-fronted overvest, and a narrow rectangular stole. Men's upper-class dress had narrow, unpleated (single-panel)  (trousers) under a loose, mandarin-collared coat, with elaborate hats of stiffened open-weave black cloth. Clothing was belted with narrow sashes.

Nara-period women's clothing was heavily influenced by Tang-dynasty China. Women adopted  collars, which overlapped like modern kimono collars, though men continued wearing round  mandarin collars, which were associated with scholasticism, only later adopting . Lower-body garments ( and ) had been worn under the outermost upper-body garments, but now, following the newer Chinese fashion, they transitioned to being worn on top (again, by women, but not yet by men).

In 718 CE, the Yoro clothing code was instituted, which stipulated that all robes had to be overlapped at the front with a left-to-right closure, following typical Chinese fashions. China considered right-over-left wraps barbaric. This convention of wear is still followed today, with a right-to-left closure worn only by the deceased.

In 752 CE, a massive bronze Buddha statue at Tōdai-ji, Nara, was consecrated with great ceremony. The ceremonial clothing of attendees (probably not all made in Japan) was preserved in the Shōsō-in. Most of them close left-over-right, but some abut or overlap right-over-left. Collar shapes include narrow, round or v-shaped. Richer garments in silk are ornamented with figural and geometric patterns, woven and dyed; some have flaring sleeves. Aprons, leggings, socks and shoes have also been preserved.

Social segregation of clothing was primarily noticeable in the Nara period (710-794), through the division of upper and lower class. People of higher social status wore clothing that covered the majority of their body, or as Svitlana Rybalko states, "the higher the status, the less was open to other people's eyes". For example, the full-length robes would cover most from the collarbone to the feet, the sleeves were to be long enough to hide their fingertips, and women carried fans were carried to protect them from speculative looks.

Heian period (794–1185) 
During the Heian period (794-1193 CE), Japan stopped sending envoys to the Chinese dynastic courts. This prevented Chinese-imported goods—including clothing—from entering the Imperial Palace and disseminating to the upper classes, who were the main arbiters of traditional Japanese culture at the time and the only people allowed to wear such clothing. The ensuing cultural vacuum facilitated the development of a Japanese culture independent from Chinese fashions.

Clothing became increasingly stylised, with some elements—such as the round-necked and tube-sleeved  jacket, worn by both genders in the early 7th century—being abandoned by both male and female courtiers. Others, such as the wrapped-front robes, also worn by men and women, were kept. Some elements, such as the  skirt worn by women, continued on in a reduced capacity, worn only to formal occasions; the  grew too narrow to wrap all the way around and became a trapezoidal pleated train. Formal  (trousers) became longer than the legs and also trailed behind the wearer. Men's formal dress included  collars and very wide sleeves.

The concept of the hidden body remained, with ideologies suggesting that the clothes served as "protection from the evil spirits and outward manifestation of a social rank". This proposed the widely held belief that those of lower ranking, who were perceived to be of less clothing due to their casual performance of manual labor, were not protected in the way that the upper class were in that time period. This was also the period in which Japanese traditional clothing became introduced to the Western world.

Kamakura period (1185–1333)

Muromachi period (1336–1573 CE)

Azuchi-Momoyama period (1568–1600) 

The  resembled a modern kimono, though at this time the sleeves were sewn shut at the back and were smaller in width (shoulder seam to cuff) than the body of the garment. During the Sengoku period (1467-1615)/Azuchi-Momoyama period (1568-1600), decoration of the  developed further, with bolder designs and flashy primary colours becoming popular.

Edo period (1603–1867)

During the Edo period (1603–1867 CE), both Japan's culture and economy developed significantly. A particular factor in the development of the Edo period was the early Genroku period (1688–1704 CE), wherein "Genroku culture" - luxurious displays of wealth and increased patronage of the arts - led to the further development of many art forms, including those of clothing. Genroku culture was spearheaded by the growing and increasingly-powerful merchant classes; the clothing of  classes, representative of their increasing economic power, rivalled that of the aristocracy and samurai classes, brightly-coloured and utilising expensive production techniques, such as handpainted dyework. , a damask fabric, also became the preferred material for kimono at this time, replacing the previously-popular  plain-weave silk, which had been used to create .

In response to the increasing material wealth of the merchant classes, the Tokugawa shogunate issued a number of sumptuary laws `for the lower classes, prohibiting the use of purple or red fabric, gold embroidery, and the use of intricately dyed  patterns.

From this point onwards, the basic shape of both men's and women's kimono remained largely unchanged. The sleeves of the  began to grow in length, especially amongst unmarried women, and the  became much longer and wider, with various styles of knots coming into fashion, alongside stiffer weaves of material to support them.

Modern period (1869–), by regnal era

Meiji period (1868–1912)

In 1869, the social class system was abolished, and with them, class-specific sumptuary laws. Kimono with formerly-restricted elements, like red and purple colours, became popular, particularly with the advent of synthetic dyestuffs such as mauvine.

During the Meiji period, the opening of Japan to Western trade after the enclosure of the Edo period led to a drive towards Western dress as a sign of "modernity". After an edict by Emperor Meiji, policemen, railroad workers and teachers moved to wearing Western clothing within their job roles, with the adoption of Western clothing by men in Japan happening at a much greater pace than by women. Initiatives such as the  promoted Western dress as everyday clothing.

In Japan, modern Japanese fashion history might be conceived as a gradual westernization of Japanese clothes; both the woolen and worsted industries in Japan originated as a product of Japan's re-established contact with the West in the early Meiji period (1850s-1860s). Before the 1860s, Japanese clothing consisted entirely of kimono of a number of varieties.

With the opening of Japan's ports for international trade in the 1860s, clothing from a number of different cultures arrived as exports; despite Japan's historic contact with the Dutch before this time through its southerly ports, Western clothing had not caught on, despite the study of and fascination with Dutch technologies and writings.

The first Japanese to adopt Western clothing were officers and men of some units of the shōgun's army and navy; sometime in the 1850s, these men adopted woolen uniforms worn by the English marines stationed at Yokohama. Wool was difficult to produce domestically, with the cloth having to be imported. Outside of the military, other early adoptions of Western dress were mostly within the public sector, and typically entirely male, with women continuing to wear kimono both inside and outside of the home, and men changing into the kimono usually within the home for comfort.

From this point on, Western clothing styles spread outwards of the military and upper public sectors, with courtiers and bureaucrats urged to adopt Western clothing, promoted as both modern and more practical. The Ministry of Education ordered that Western-style student uniforms be worn in public colleges and universities. Businessmen, teachers, doctors, bankers, and other leaders of the new society wore suits to work and at large social functions. Despite Western clothing becoming popular within the workplace, in schools and on the streets, it was not worn by everybody, and was actively considered uncomfortable and undesirable by some; one account tells of a father promising to buy his daughters new kimono as a reward for wearing Western clothing and eating meat. By the 1890s, appetite for Western dress as a fashion statement had cooled considerably, and the kimono remained an item of fashion.

A number of different fashions from the West arrived and were also incorporated into the way that people wore kimono; numerous woodblock prints from the later Meiji period show men wearing bowler hats and carrying Western-style umbrellas whilst wearing kimono, and Gibson girl hairstyles - typically a large bun on top of a relatively wide hairstyle, similar to the Japanese  - became popular amongst Japanese women as a more low-effort hairstyle for everyday life.

By the beginning of the 20th century, Western dress had become a symbol of social dignity and progressiveness; however, the kimono was still considered to be fashion, with the two styles of dress essentially growing in parallel with one another over time. With Western dress being considered street wear and a more formal display of fashionable clothing, most Japanese people wore the comfortable kimono at home and when out of the public eye.

Taishō period (1912–1926)
Western clothing quickly became standard issue as army uniform for men and school uniform for boys, and between 1920 and 1930, the  sailor outfit replaced the kimono and undivided  as school uniform for girls. However, kimono still remained popular as an item of everyday fashion; following the Great Kantō Earthquake of 1923, cheap, informal and ready-to-wear  kimono, woven from raw and waste silk threads unsuitable for other uses, became highly popular, following the loss of many people's possessions. By 1930, ready-to-wear  kimono had become highly popular for their bright, seasonally changing designs, many of which took inspiration from the Art Deco movement.  kimono were usually dyed using the ikat technique of dyeing, where either warp or both warp and weft threads (known as ) were dyed using a stencil pattern before weaving.

It was during the Taishō period that the modern formalisation of kimono and kimono types began to emerge. The Meiji period had seen the slow introduction of kimono types that mediated between the informal and the most formal, a trend that continued throughout the Taishō period, as social occasions and opportunities for leisure increased under the abolition of class distinctions. The bridal kimono trousseau, an uncommon practice of the upper classes in the Edo period, also became common throughout the middle classes; traditions of kimono bridalwear for marriage ceremonies were also codified in this time, which resembled the bridalwear of samurai-class women. However,  standards were still relatively informal, and would not become formalised until after World War II.

Shōwa period (1926–1989)

While kimono were no longer common wear for men, they remained everyday wear for Japanese women until World War II (1940–1945).

Until the 1930s, the majority of Japanese still wore kimono, and Western clothes were still restricted to out-of-home use by certain classes.

During the war, kimono factories shut down, and the government encouraged people to wear  (also romanised as ) - trousers constructed from old kimono - instead. Fibres such as rayon became widespread during WWII, being inexpensive to produce and cheap to buy, and typically featured printed designs. Cloth rationing persisted until 1951, so most kimono were made at home from repurposed fabrics.

In the second half of the 20th century, the Japanese economy boomed, and silk became cheaper, making it possible for the average family to afford silk kimono. The kimono retail industry had developed an elaborate codification of rules for kimono-wearing, with types of kimono, levels of formality, and rules on seasonality, which intensified after the war; there had previously been rules about kimono-wearing, but these were not rigidly codified and varied by region and class. Formalisation sought perfection, with no creases or uneveness in the kimono, and an increasingly tubular figure was promoted as the ideal for women in kimono. The kimono-retail industry also promoted a sharp distinction between Japanese and Western clothes; for instance, wearing Western shoes with Japanese clothing (while common in the Taishō period) was codified as improper; these rules on proper dressing are often described in Japanese using the English phrase "Time, Place, and Occasion" (TPO). As neither Japanese men or women commonly wore kimono, having grown up under wartime auspices, commercial  schools were set up to teach women how to don kimono. Men in this period rarely wore kimono, and menswear thus escaped most of the formalisation.).

Bridal trousseaus containing tens of kimono of every possible subtype were also promoted as de rigueur, and parents felt obliged to provide kimono trousseaus that cost up to 10 million yen (~£70,000), which were displayed and inspected publicly as part of the wedding, including being transported in transparent trucks.

By the 1970s, formal kimono formed the vast majority of kimono sales. Kimono retailers, due to the pricing structure of brand new kimono, had developed a relative monopoly on not only prices but also a perception of kimono knowledge, allowing them to dictate prices and heavily promote more formal (and expensive) purchases, as selling a single formal kimono could support the seller comfortably for three months. The kimono industry peaked in 1975, with total sales of 2.8 trillion yen (~£18 billion). The sale of informal brand new kimono was largely neglected.

Heisei period (1989–2019)
 
The economic collapse of the 1990s bankrupted much of the kimono industry and ended a number of expensive practices. The rules for how to wear kimono lost their previous hold over the entire industry, and formerly-expensive traditions such as bridal kimono trousseaus generally disappeared, and when still given, were much less extensive. It was during this time that it became acceptable and even preferred for women to wear Western dress to ceremonial occasions like weddings and funerals. Many women had dozens or even hundreds of kimono, mostly unworn, in their homes; a secondhand kimono, even if unworn, would sell for about 500 yen (less than £3.50; about US$5), a few percent of the bought-new price. In the 1990s and early 2000s, many secondhand kimono shops opened as a result of this.

In the early years of the 21st century, the cheaper and simpler  became popular with young people. Around 2010, men began wearing kimono again in situations other than their own wedding, and kimono were again promoted and worn as everyday dress by a small minority.

Reiwa period (2019–present)
Today, the vast majority of people in Japan wear Western clothing in the everyday, and are most likely to wear kimono either to formal occasions such as wedding ceremonies and funerals, or to summer events, where the standard kimono is the easy-to-wear, single-layer cotton .

Types of traditional clothing

Kimono

The kimono , labelled the "national costume of Japan", is the most well-known form of traditional Japanese clothing. The kimono is worn wrapped around the body, left side over right, and is sometimes worn layered. Kimono differ in construction and wear between men and women.

After the four-class system ended in the Tokugawa period (1603-1867), the symbolic meaning of the kimono shifted from a reflection of social class to a reflection of self, allowing people to incorporate their own tastes and individualize their outfit. Post-WW2, kimono schools were built to teach those interested in kimono how to wear it and tie a number of different knots.

A number of different types of kimono exist that are worn in the modern day, with women having more varieties than men.

Women's kimono
The  (lit., "swinging sleeve") is a type of formal kimono usually worn by young women, often for Coming of Age Day or as bridalwear, and is considered the most formal kimono for young women.
The  is also worn as bridalwear as an unbelted outer layer.
The  is a low-formality solid-colour kimono worn for tea ceremony and other mildly-formal events.

In previous decades, women only stopped wearing the  when they got married, typically in their early- to mid-twenties; however, in the modern day, a woman will usually stop wearing  around this time whether she is married or not.

Dressing in kimono
The word kimono literally translates as "thing to wear", and up until the 19th century it was the main form of dress worn by men and women alike in Japan.

Traditionally, the art of wearing kimono (known as ) was passed from mother to daughter as simply learning how to dress, and in the modern day, this is also taught in specialist kimono schools. Then the undergarments are put on followed by a top and a wraparound skirt. Finally, the kimono is put on, with the left side covering the right, tied in place with one or two  and smoothed over with a  belt. The  is then tied in place. Kimono are always worn left-over-right unless being worn by the dead, in which case they are worn right-over-left. When the kimono is worn outside, either  or  sandals are traditionally worn.

Women typically wear kimono when they attend traditional arts, such as a tea ceremonies or  classes. During wedding ceremonies, the bride and groom will often go through many costume changes; though the bride may start off in an entirely-white outfit before switching to a colourful one, grooms will wear black kimono made from habutae silk.

Funeral kimono for both men and women are plain black with five crests, though Western clothing is also worn to funerals. Any plain black kimono with less than five crests is not considered to be mourning wear.

The "coming of age" ceremony, is another occasion where kimono are worn. At these annual celebrations, women wear brightly-coloured , often with fur stoles around the neck.

Seasons
Kimono are matched with seasons.  (lined) kimono, made of silk, wool, or synthetic fabrics, are worn during the cooler months. During these months, kimono with more rustic colours and patterns (like russet leaves), and kimono with darker colours and multiple layers, are favoured. Lightweight cotton  are worn by men and women during the spring and summer months. In the warmer weather months, vibrant colors and floral designs (like cherry blossoms) are common.

Materials

Up until the 15th century the vast majority of kimono worn by most people were made of hemp or linen, and they were made with multiple layers of materials. Today, kimono can be made of silk, silk brocade, silk crepes (such as ) and satin weaves (such as ). Modern kimono that are made with less-expensive easy-care fabrics such as rayon, cotton sateen, cotton, polyester and other synthetic fibers, are more widely worn today in Japan. However, silk is still considered the ideal fabric for more formal kimono.

These pieces are sewn together to create the basic T-shape. However, even machine-made kimono require substantial hand-stitching.

The finished kimono consists of four main strips of fabric — two panels covering the body and two panels forming the sleeves — with additional smaller strips forming the narrow front panels and collar. Kimono fabrics are frequently hand-made and -decorated.

Kimono are worn with sash-belts called , of which there are several varieties. In previous centuries,  were relatively pliant and soft, so literally held the kimono closed; modern-day  are generally stiffer, meaning the kimono is actually kept closed through tying a series of flat ribbons, such as kumihimo, around the body.

The  is an informal kimono worn specifically in the spring and summer, and it is generally less expensive than the traditional kimono. Because it was made for warm weather,  are almost entirely made of cotton of an often lighter weight and brighter color than most kimono fabrics. It is worn for festivals and cherry blossom viewing ceremonies.

The , which resembles a long, wide pleated skirt, is generally worn over the kimono and is considered formal wear. Although it was traditionally created to be worn by men of all occupations (craftsmen, farmers, samurai, etc.), it is now socially accepted to be worn by women as well.

The  is similar to a belt, wrapping around the outer kimono and helping to keep all of the layers together, though it does not actually tie them closed.  are typically long, rectangular belts that can be decorated and coloured in a variety of different ways, as well as being made of a number of different fabrics. Modern  are typically made of a crisp, if not stiff, weave of fabric, and may be relatively thick and unpliant.

 are a type of sandal worn with kimono that resemble flip-flops by design, with the exception that the base is sturdier and at times forms a gently sloping heel.  can be made of wood, leather and vinyl, with more formal varieties featuring decorated straps (known as ) that may be embroidered and woven with gold and silver yarn. These shoes are typically worn with white socks usually mostly covered by the kimono's hem.  are sandals similar to  that are made to be worn in the snow or dirt, featured with wooden columns underneath the shoes.

Design

Designers
Multiple designers use the kimono as a foundation for their current designs, being influenced by its cultural and aesthetic aspects and including them into their garments.

Issey Miyake is most known for crossing boundaries in fashion and reinventing forms of clothing while simultaneously transmitting the traditional qualities of the culture into his work. He has explored various techniques in design, provoking discussion on what identifies as "dress". He has also been tagged the "Picasso of Fashion" due to his recurring confrontation of traditional values. Miyake found interest in working with dancers to create clothing that would best suit them and their aerobic movements, eventually replacing the models he initially worked with for dancers, in hopes of producing clothing that benefits people of all classifications. His use of pleats and polyester jersey reflected a modern form of fashion due to their practical comfort and elasticity. Over 10 years of Miyake's work was featured in Paris in 1998 at the "Issey Miyake: Making Things" exhibition. His two most popular series were titled, "Pleats, Please" and "A-POC (A piece of Cloth)".

Yohji Yamamoto and Rei Kawakubo are Japanese fashion designers who share similar tastes in design and style, their work often considered by the public to be difficult to differentiate. They were influenced by social conflicts, as their recognizable work bloomed and was influenced by the post war era of Japan. They differ from Miyake and several other fashion designers in their dominating use of dark colors, especially the color black. Traditional clothing often included a variety of colors in their time, and their use of "the absence of color" provoked multiple critics to voice their opinions and criticize the authenticity of their work. American Vogue of April 1983 labeled the two "avant-garde designers", eventually leading them to their success and popularity.

Aesthetics
The Japanese are often recognized for their traditional art and its capability of transforming simplicity into creative designs. As stated by Valerie Foley, "Fan shapes turn out to be waves, waves metamorphose into mountains; simple knots are bird wings; wobbly semicircles signify half-submerged Heian period carriage wheels". These art forms have been transferred onto fabric that then mold into clothing. With traditional clothing, specific techniques are used and followed, such as metal applique, silk embroidery, and paste- resist. The type of fabric used to produce the clothing was often indicative of a person's social class, for the wealthy were able to afford clothing created with fabrics of higher quality. Stitching techniques and the fusion of colors also distinguished the wealthy from the commoner, as those of higher power had a tendency to wear ornate, brighter clothing.

Influence on modern fashion

Tokyo street fashion

Japanese street fashion emerged in the 1990s and differed from traditional fashion in the sense that it was initiated and popularized by the general public, specifically teenagers, rather than by fashion designers. Different forms of street fashion have emerged in different Tokyo locales, such as the rorīta in Harajuku, the koakuma ageha of Shibuya or the Gyaru subculture fashion style.

Lolita fashion became popular in the mid 2000s. It is characterized by "a knee length skirt or dress in a bell shape assisted by petticoats, worn with a blouse, knee high socks or stockings and a headdress". The style is also characterized by lighter hair and sparkly accessories. The  trend is found in both Shibuya and Harajuku, and is influenced by a "schoolgirl" look, with participants often wearing short skirts, oversized knee-high socks. It is also characterized by artificially tanned skin or dark makeup, pale lipstick, and light hair.

See also 
 Culture of Japan
  – traditional Okinawan clothing
  – traditional Chinese clothing
  – traditional Korean clothing
  – traditional Vietnamese clothing

References

External links

Video about Traditional Japanese Wear